"There Is" is the second and final single from Box Car Racer's eponymous album. Guitarist and vocalist Tom DeLonge still occasionally plays a solo version of this song in concert with Angels & Airwaves. The single peaked at number 32 on the Billboard Modern Rock Tracks chart.

The band performed the song live on The Tonight Show with Jay Leno on September 3, 2002, and on The Late Late Show with Craig Kilborn on October 17, 2002.

Track listing
 "There Is" (Radio edit) – 3:08
 "Tiny Voices" – 3:27

Music video
In the music video, the band plays the song in the rain outside of a house, where a teenage boy is trying to get a girl to talk to him from her bedroom window. During the video, people come out of their houses trying to make the band stop. A policeman comes and takes away Tom DeLonge towards the end, as the boy runs into the girl's house and upstairs to her room to see her. The music video for the song was inspired by the film Say Anything... (1989), and was directed by Alexander Kosta. It can be seen on the Box Car Racer DVD.

Charts

Release history

References

External links

2002 songs
2002 singles
Songs written by Travis Barker
Songs written by Tom DeLonge
MCA Records singles